The 2013 season marked São Paulo's 84th year since the club's existence. Playing in the Campeonato Paulista, the club reached the semi-finals, before being eliminated in a penalty shoot-out after a 0-0 (3-4) against Corinthians. São Paulo participated in the continental tournament, Copa Libertadores, returning to the most important South American competition following a two-year absence, in a spot by the title of Copa Sudamericana won in the previous year and by the qualifying group of national league with a 4th position reached in the end of competition. Due to the continental title of Copa Sudamericana, the team was enabled to dispute of Recopa Sudamericana (against the winner of Copa Libertadores and rival Corinthians) and Suruga Bank Championship (playing against 2012 J. League Cup champion Kashima Antlers). In the first opportunity of title by the Recopa Sudamericana the Tricolor was defeated by rival with a two-legs lost (1–2 home; 0–2 away). Before long the club went to Japan to compete the Suruga Bank Championship and over again was defeated by opponent in a single match result: 2–3. In participation of Copa Libertadores the team advanced the first and second stages but was eliminated on the round of 16 by the club which would be champion that year, Atlético Mineiro, with two negative results (1–2 home; 1–4 away). In the second half of the year, São Paulo had hard times with an historical winless sequence of 14 matches (12 by official competitions) being only closed in a friendly match against Benfica just after 2 months and hand an official victory against Fluminense 2 weeks later by the Campeonato Brasileiro. Due to the negative campaign Tricolor remained on the relegated group for 11 rounds achieving the 9th position on the end of season by recovery at the second half of championship after the return of notable coach Muricy Ramalho who trained São Paulo in two previous opportunities reaching 4 titles including an historical sequence of 3 titles in national league. After Muricy Ramalho's arrival the team improved the average of points earned, reaching the fourth position in second half of league. In the end of season São Paulo play the Copa Sudamericana by defend of the title won in the previous edition, however the team was defeated in semi-finals by another paulista club Ponte Preta with (1-3 home; 1–1 away).

Players

Current squad

Removed from the first squad

Out on loan

 Until May 20
 Until December 31
 Until May 21
Until December 31
 Until December 31
 Until June 30
 Until December 31
 Until December 31
 Until December 31
 Until December 31
 Until June 2014
 Until July 2014
 Until December 31
 Until December 31

Transfers

In

Out

Statistics

Appearances and goals

|-
|colspan="16" style="text-align:center;" |Players who are on loan/left São Paulo this season:
|-

|}

Top scorers

Clean sheets
Includes all competitive matches. The list is sorted by shirt number when total clean sheets are equal.

Last updated on 13 November

Disciplinary record
{| class="wikitable" style="font-size: 95%; text-align: center;"
|-
| rowspan="2" style="width:5%; text-align:center;"|
| rowspan="2" style="width:5%; text-align:center;"|
| rowspan="2" style="width:5%; text-align:center;"|
| rowspan="2" style="width:15%; text-align:center;"|Player
| colspan="3" style="text-align:center;"|Campeonato Paulista
| colspan="3" style="text-align:center;"|Copa Libertadores
| colspan="3" style="text-align:center;"|Campeonato Brasileiro
| colspan="3" style="text-align:center;"|Recopa/Suruga
| colspan="3" style="text-align:center;"|Copa Sudamericana
| colspan="3" style="text-align:center;"|Total
|-
! style="width:60px; background:#fe9;"| 
! style="width:60px; background:#ff8888;"|
! style="width:60px; background:#ff8888;"|
! style="width:60px; background:#fe9;"|
! style="width:60px; background:#ff8888;"|
! style="width:60px; background:#ff8888;"|
! style="width:60px; background:#fe9;"|
! style="width:60px; background:#ff8888;"|
! style="width:60px; background:#ff8888;"|
! style="width:60px; background:#fe9;"|
! style="width:60px; background:#ff8888;"|
! style="width:60px; background:#ff8888;"|
! style="width:60px; background:#fe9;"|
! style="width:60px; background:#ff8888;"|
! style="width:60px; background:#ff8888;"|
! style="width:60px; background:#fe9;"|
! style="width:60px; background:#ff8888;"|
! style="width:60px; background:#ff8888;"|
|-
|GK
|
|01
|Rogério Ceni
|2
|0
|0
|0
|0
|0
|3
|0
|0
|0
|0
|0
|0
|0
|0
|5
|0
|0
|-
|DF
|
|2
|Rafael Toloi
|5
|0
|0
|2
|0
|0
|3
|0
|0
|0
|0
|0
|0
|0
|0
|10
|0
|0
|-
|DF
|
|3
|Roger Carvalho
|0
|0
|0
|0
|0
|0
|0
|0
|0
|0
|0
|0
|0
|0
|0
|0
|0
|0
|-
|DF
|
|4
|Antônio Carlos
|0
|0
|0
|0
|0
|0
|3
|0
|1
|0
|0
|0
|2
|0
|0
|5
|0
|1
|-
|MF
|
|5
|Wellington
|4
|0
|0
|3
|0
|0
|9
|1
|0
|1
|0
|0
|3
|0
|0
|20
|1
|0
|-
|DF
|
|6
|Clemente Rodríguez
|0
|0
|0
|0
|0
|0
|0
|1
|0
|0
|0
|0
|0
|0
|0
|0
|1
|0
|-
|MF
|
|7
|Rodrigo Caio
|1
|1
|0
|0
|0
|0
|4
|0
|0
|0
|0
|0
|1
|0
|0
|6
|1
|0
|-
|MF
|
|8
|PH Ganso
|3
|0
|0
|2
|0
|0
|3
|0
|0
|1
|0
|0
|0
|0
|1
|9
|0
|1
|-
|FW
|
|9
|Luís Fabiano
|1
|0
|0
|1
|0
|1
|7
|1
|0
|0
|0
|0
|1
|0
|0
|10
|1
|1
|-
|MF
|
|10
|Jádson
|2
|0
|0
|4
|0
|0
|4
|0
|0
|1
|0
|0
|0
|0
|0
|11
|0
|0
|-
|FW
|
|11
|Ademilson
|0
|0
|0
|0
|0
|0
|1
|0
|0
|0
|0
|0
|0
|0
|0
|1
|0
|0
|-
|GK
|
|12
|Denis
|0
|0
|0
|0
|0
|0
|0
|0
|0
|0
|0
|0
|0
|0
|0
|0
|0
|0
|-
|DF
|
|13
|Paulo Miranda
|0
|0
|0
|2
|0
|0
|6
|0
|0
|0
|0
|0
|1
|0
|0
|9
|0
|0
|-
|DF
|
|14
|Edson Silva
|1
|0
|0
|0
|0
|0
|1
|1
|0
|0
|0
|0
|1
|0
|0
|3
|1
|0
|-
|MF
|
|15
|Denílson
|4
|0
|0
|3
|0
|0
|7
|1
|2
|0
|0
|0
|1
|0
|0
|15
|1
|2
|-
|DF
|
|16
|Carleto
|3
|0
|1
|0
|0
|1
|0
|0
|0
|0
|0
|0
|0
|0
|0
|3
|0
|2
|-
|FW
|
|17
|Osvaldo
|2
|0
|0
|2
|0
|0
|1
|0
|1
|0
|0
|0
|0
|0
|0
|5
|0
|1
|-
|MF
|
|18
|Maicon
|1
|0
|1
|1
|0
|0
|6
|0
|1
|0
|0
|0
|1
|0
|0
|9
|0
|2
|-
|FW
|
|19
|Aloísio
|0
|1
|0
|1
|0
|0
|8
|0
|0
|0
|0
|0
|0
|0
|0
|9
|1
|0
|-
|MF
|
|20
|Lucas Evangelista
|0
|0
|0
|0
|0
|0
|2
|0
|0
|0
|0
|0
|0
|0
|0
|2
|0
|0
|-
|FW
|
|22
|Silvinho
|0
|0
|0
|0
|0
|0
|0
|0
|0
|0
|0
|0
|0
|0
|0
|0
|0
|0
|-
|DF
|
|23
|Douglas
|3
|0
|0
|1
|0
|0
|6
|0
|0
|1
|0
|0
|2
|0
|0
|13
|0
|0
|-
|GK
|
|24
|Léo
|0
|0
|0
|0
|0
|0
|0
|0
|0
|0
|0
|0
|0
|0
|0
|0
|0
|0
|-
|MF
|
|25
|Fabrício
|2
|0
|0
|1
|0
|0
|1
|0
|0
|0
|0
|0
|0
|0
|0
|4
|0
|0
|-
|DF
|
|27
|Lucas Farias
|0
|0
|0
|0
|0
|0
|0
|0
|0
|0
|0
|0
|0
|0
|0
|0
|0
|0
|-
|MF
|
|28
|João Schmidt
|0
|0
|0
|0
|0
|0
|0
|0
|0
|0
|0
|0
|0
|0
|0
|0
|0
|0
|-
|FW
|
|29
|Negueba
|0
|0
|0
|0
|0
|0
|0
|0
|0
|0
|0
|0
|0
|0
|0
|0
|0
|0
|-
|GK
|
|30
|Renan Ribeiro
|0
|0
|0
|0
|0
|0
|0
|0
|0
|0
|0
|0
|0
|0
|0
|0
|0
|0
|-
|DF
|
|32
|Mateus Caramelo
|0
|0
|0
|0
|0
|0
|2
|0
|0
|0
|0
|0
|0
|0
|0
|2
|0
|0
|-
|DF
|
|33
|Lucas Silva
|0
|0
|0
|0
|0
|0
|0
|0
|0
|0
|0
|0
|0
|0
|0
|0
|0
|0
|-
|DF
|
|34
|Diego
|0
|0
|0
|0
|0
|0
|0
|0
|0
|0
|0
|0
|0
|0
|0
|0
|0
|0
|-
|MF
|
|35
|Allan
|0
|0
|0
|0
|0
|0
|0
|0
|0
|0
|0
|0
|0
|0
|0
|0
|0
|0
|-
|FW
|
|37
|Welliton
|0
|0
|0
|0
|0
|0
|0
|0
|0
|0
|0
|0
|0
|0
|0
|0
|0
|0
|-
|DF
|
|38
|Reinaldo
|0
|0
|0
|0
|0
|0
|2
|0
|0
|0
|0
|0
|0
|0
|0
|2
|0
|0
|-
|FW
|
|39
|Adelino
|0
|0
|0
|0
|0
|0
|0
|0
|0
|0
|0
|0
|0
|0
|0
|0
|0
|0
|-
|colspan="22"|Players who are on loan/left São Paulo this season:
|-
|DF
|
|3
|Lúcio
|3
|0
|1
|1
|1
|0
|2
|0
|0
|0
|0
|0
|0
|0
|0
|6
|1
|1
|-
|DF
|
|4
|Rhodolfo
|3
|0
|0
|1
|0
|0
|0
|0
|0
|0
|0
|0
|0
|0
|0
|4
|0
|0
|-
|DF
|
|6
|Cortez
|0
|0
|0
|0
|0
|0
|0
|0
|0
|0
|0
|0
|0
|0
|0
|0
|0
|0
|-
|MF
|
|20
|Marcelo Cañete
|2
|1
|0
|0
|0
|0
|0
|0
|0
|0
|0
|0
|0
|0
|0
|2
|1
|0
|-
|DF
|
|21
|João Filipe
|2
|0
|0
|0
|0
|0
|0
|0
|0
|0
|0
|0
|0
|0
|0
|2
|0
|0
|-
|MF
|
|21
|Roni
|0
|0
|0
|0
|0
|0
|1
|0
|0
|0
|0
|0
|0
|0
|0
|1
|0
|0
|-
|MF
|
|22
|Casemiro
|0
|0
|0
|0
|0
|0
|0
|0
|0
|0
|0
|0
|0
|0
|0
|0
|0
|0
|-
|DF
|
|26
|Henrique Miranda
|0
|0
|0
|0
|0
|0
|0
|0
|0
|0
|0
|0
|0
|0
|0
|0
|0
|0
|-
|DF
|
|26
|Juan
|0
|0
|0
|0
|0
|0
|1
|0
|0
|1
|0
|0
|0
|0
|0
|2
|0
|0
|-
|FW
|
|29
|Wallyson
|0
|0
|0
|0
|0
|0
|0
|0
|0
|0
|0
|0
|0
|0
|0
|0
|0
|0
|-
|DF
|
|34
|Luiz Eduardo
|0
|0
|0
|0
|0
|0
|0
|0
|0
|0
|0
|0
|0
|0
|0
|0
|0
|0
|-
|MF
|
|36
|Régis
|0
|0
|0
|0
|0
|0
|0
|0
|0
|0
|0
|0
|0
|0
|0
|0
|0
|0
|-
|FW
|
|38
|Tiago
|0
|0
|0
|0
|0
|0
|0
|0
|0
|0
|0
|0
|0
|0
|0
|0
|0
|0
|-
|
|
|
|Total
|44
|3
|3
|25
|1
|2
|83
|5
|5
|5
|0
|0
|13
|0
|1
|170
|9
|11

Captains

Managers performance

Overview
{|class="wikitable"
|-
|Games played || 78 (21 Campeonato Paulista, 10 Copa Libertadores, 38 Campeonato Brasileiro, 2 Recopa, 1 Copa Suruga Bank, 6 Copa Sudamericana)
|-
|Games won || 33 (14 Campeonato Paulista, 3 Copa Libertadores, 14 Campeonato Brasileiro, 0 Recopa, 0 Copa Suruga Bank, 2 Copa Sudamericana)
|-
|Games drawn || 15 (3 Campeonato Paulista, 1 Copa Libertadores, 8 Campeonato Brasileiro, 0 Recopa, 0 Copa Suruga Bank, 3 Copa Sudamericana)
|-
|Games lost || 30 (4 Campeonato Paulista, 6 Copa Libertadores, 16 Campeonato Brasileiro, 2 Recopa, 1 Copa Suruga Bank, 1 Copa Sudamericana)
|-
|Goals scored || 105
|-
|Goals conceded || 93
|-
|Goal difference || +12
|-
|Clean sheets || 26 (9 Campeonato Paulista, 2 Copa Libertadores, 14 Campeonato Brasileiro, 1 Copa Sudamericana)
|-
|Yellow cards || 170 (44 Campeonato Paulista, 25 Copa Libertadores, 83 Campeonato Brasileiro, 5 Recopa Sudamericana, 13 Copa Sudamericana)
|-
|Second yellow cards || 9 (3 Campeonato Paulista, 1 Copa Libertadores, 5 Campeonato Brasileiro)
|-
|Red cards || 11 (3 Campeonato Paulista, 2 Copa Libertadores, 5 Campeonato Brasileiro, 1 Copa Sudamericana)
|-
|Worst discipline || Wellington (20 , 1 , 0 )
|-
|Best result || 5–0 (H) v Bolívar - Copa Libertadores - 2013.01.23
|-
|Worst result || 1–4 (A) v Atlético Mineiro - Copa Libertadores - 2013.05.08
|-
|Most appearances || Rogério Ceni (67)
|-
|Top scorer || Aloísio and Luís Fabiano (21)
|-

Friendlies

Audi Cup

Eusébio Cup

Competitions

Overall

Campeonato Paulista

Results summary

First stage

Knockout stage

Quarter-final

Semi-final

Copa Libertadores

Results Summary

First stage

Group stage

Knockout stage

Round of 16

Campeonato Brasileiro

Results Summary

Results by Round

Matches

Recopa Sudamericana

Suruga Bank Championship

Copa Sudamericana

Results Summary

Round of 16

Quarter-finals

Semi-finals

References

External links
official website 

São Paulo FC seasons
Sao Paulo F.C.